The Ruth Benedict Prize is an award given annually by the American Anthropological Association's "to acknowledge excellence in a scholarly book written from an anthropological perspective about a lesbian, gay, bisexual, or transgender topic". The award was established in 1986 in honor of anthropologist, Ruth Benedict (1887–1948) and is given in two separate categories: a monograph by a single author and an edited volume.

List of winners

See also

 List of anthropology awards

References

anthropology awards
LGBT literary awards
Awards established in 1986
1986 establishments in the United States